Tröger or Troeger may refer to:

Sabine Tröger (born 1967), Austrian sprinter 
Julius Tröger (1862–1942), German chemist
Tröger's base, an organic compound
Christian Tröger (born 1969), German swimmer
Paul Tröger (1913–1992), German chess player and journalist